NextJet was one of the largest regional airlines in Sweden. It was headquartered in Frösundavik in Solna Municipality, just north of Stockholm. The airline filed for bankruptcy on 16 May 2018, half a year after one of its planes was believed to be sabotaged.

Overview
NextJet served most of their domestic destinations from Stockholm-Arlanda Airport. As of summer 2010 they also served a lot of domestic destinations from Stockholm-Bromma Airport on behalf of Sverigeflyg as well as Stockholm-Arlanda Airport and Helsinki-Vantaa Airport from Mariehamn Airport on the behalf of Air Åland. Many of the domestic routes operated by NextJet were subsidised by the Swedish government. Its IATA airline designator, 2N, is shared with the Ukrainian Південмашавіа / Yuzhmashair.

One of the airline's investors was former member of ABBA, Björn Ulvaeus. It also operated taxi and executive charter flights with two business jet aircraft. Since 2012, the main owner of Nextjet had been Örnsköldsvik's local business life through Höga Kusten Flyg AB, and the owner's aim was to secure the air connections to Stockholm. Since July 2016 Nextjet group (Nextjet Sverige AB, Nextjet AB and Sweports AB and Höga Kusten Flyg -brand) is mutually owned by Jakobstad-based energy company Katternö, Air Åland and Magnus Ivarsson - current Nextjet CEO and one of airline founders.

On 16 May 2018, the airline filed for bankruptcy. It subsequently shut down operations and cancelled all flights that departed after 1pm that day. However on 1 June 2018, the airline was purchased by Olsen Group to resume operations on 11 June 2018, rebranding the airline as Air Scandic.

Destinations

NextJet served the following destinations (as of May 2017):

Fleet
At the time of bankruptcy in May 2018, the NextJet fleet included the following aircraft:

Gällivare airport incident
Six months prior to its demise, Nextjet experienced difficulty when one of its aircraft was sabotaged, resulting in closure of an airport and its air traffic.

References

External links

Official website

Defunct airlines of Sweden
Airlines established in 2002
Airlines disestablished in 2018